Mark Riss (born 13 September 1994) is a speedway rider from Germany.

Speedway career
He rode in the top tier of British Speedway, riding for the Belle Vue Aces and Wolverhampton Wolves in the SGB Premiership 2018. He began his British career riding for Edinburgh Monarchs in 2016.

Family
He is the son of Gerd Riss, one of the leading German riders of all time. His brother Erik Riss also rides at the highest level.

References 

1994 births
Living people
German speedway riders
Belle Vue Aces riders
Edinburgh Monarchs riders
Wolverhampton Wolves riders
People from Memmingen
Sportspeople from Swabia (Bavaria)